The Communist League of India (Marxist–Leninist) was founded by a faction of the Central Reorganisation Committee, Communist Party of India (Marxist-Leninist) -Ram Nath group on 20 February 1978. CLI (ML) holds that India is a less developed but still capitalist country, so the coming revolution will be a socialist one. Over the years this party got divided into numerous different factions.

The first faction, led by Ramnath, publishes 'Lal Tara' in Hindi. They have a publication called 'Gargi publication'.

The second faction is accused by all others as the most revisionist one. This faction is trying to understand the problems of 20th century socialism from critical perspectives. this faction believes that socialism needs to be re-articulated given the experiences, both positive and negative, of the socialist experiments in the last century. It has published many books including "Globalisation Of Capital".

The third faction and is among the most organized factions, is the Re-organizing Committee, Communist League of India (Marxist-Leninist). It regularly publishes a party-organ called "Lal Salaam" every six months and maintains a web-site www.cli-ml.com.  This faction is mainly engaged in organizing industrial workers in North India.

External links
Communist League of India (Marxist-Leninist)

.

Defunct communist parties in India
Political parties established in 1978
1978 establishments in India
Political parties with year of disestablishment missing